Boumelaha is a surname. Notable people with the surname include:

 Olivier Boumelaha (born 1981), French footballer, brother of Sabri and Virgile
 Sabri Boumelaha (born 1989), Algerian footballer
 Virgile Boumelaha (born 1983), French footballer